First Baptist Church is a Baptist church located at 400 S. Broad Street in Burlington, Alamance County, North Carolina. It is affiliated with the Southern Baptist Convention. The church was built in 1922–1924, and is a two-story, brick Neoclassical Revival style church building with stone ornamentation. The front facade features an Ionic order hexastyle portico. The educational building was added in 1939 and a Sunday School and chapel wing in 1953.

It was added to the National Register of Historic Places in 1984.

References

Baptist churches in North Carolina
Churches in Burlington, North Carolina
Churches on the National Register of Historic Places in North Carolina
Neoclassical architecture in North Carolina
Churches completed in 1922
20th-century Baptist churches in the United States
National Register of Historic Places in Alamance County, North Carolina
Southern Baptist Convention churches
Neoclassical church buildings in the United States